This is a list of films which have placed number one at the weekend box office in the United Kingdom during 2011.

Films

References

2011
United Kingdom
2011 in British cinema